Tamara is a female given name most commonly derived from the Biblical name "Tamar" and in the Arabic from the singular form "Tamra" (Arabic: تَمْرَة tamrah) and the plural form "Tamar" (Arabic: تَمْر tamr), meaning in both Hebrew and Arabic the generic name of the fruit "date", "date palm" or "palm tree".  

In central and eastern European countries like Armenia, Bulgaria, Croatia, Georgia, Hungary, North Macedonia, Poland, Russia, Serbia, Slovenia and Ukraine it has been a common name for centuries. In Australia it was very popular from the 1960s to 1990s. One of the most popular names in Russia.

In the United States, the name was fairly common from the late 1950s to mid 1990s, bolstered by the popularity of the film Tammy and the Bachelor and its theme song (Tammy is commonly a nickname for Tamara). In the US the most girls named Tamara were born in 1970 and the number of Tamaras born per year was greater than 1,000 as late as 1996.

The name is now fairly uncommon in the US: in 2010, the name fell off the Top 1000 SSA Baby Names list, with fewer than 250 baby girls named Tamara that year.

Variants
Variations include Tamar, Temara, Tamra, Tamera, and Tamora. In Arabic it is pronounced /tæˈmæːrɐ/ (written تمارا or تمارة). The most common US nickname for Tamara is Tammy or Tam, but other nicknames exist, such as Tatia (თათია) Tamar (თამარ) Tamuna (თამუნა), Tamari (თამარი), Tamriko (თამრიკო) or Tako (თაკო) in Georgia, Toma in Russia, Mara, Tama or Tara.

One notable occurrence of the name 'Tamora' in literature is a character in Shakespeare's Titus Andronicus. In this play, Tamora is an ambitious and vengeful woman. Her sons plan to rape the daughter of Titus Andronicus and Tamora refuses the girl's pleas to stop them. Titus, in revenge for the brutal rape and disfigurement of his daughter, kills the young men, has them baked into a pie, and serves the pie to Tamora. Titus tells her that she has just eaten her sons immediately before killing her.

The term 'tamarro' entered Italian through the Neapolitan dialect, meaning "lowlife", "scumbag", with a specific bent to people who have a very strong tendency to copy the general mode, have uncultured behaviour and tend to buy and flaunt expensive branded goods.

Notable people  

Tamara Adrián, Venezuelan politician
Tamara Al-Gabbani, Middle Eastern fashion designer
Tamara Bleszynski, Indonesian actress, singer, and model
Tamara Braun, American soap opera actress
Tamara Buciuceanu, Romanian actress
Tamara Bunke, better known as Tania the Guerrilla, a communist revolutionary
Tamara Danz, German rock singer
Tamara Degtyaryova (Russian: Тамара Васильевна Дегтярёва; 1944 –  2018), Russian stage, television and film actress
Tamara Dobson, African-American actress and model
Tamara Drasin, Ukrainian-born singer-actress
Tamara Duisenova, Kazakh politician
Tamara Ecclestone, English-Serbian socialite, television personality and model
Tamara Feldman, American actress
Tamara Finkelstein, British civil servant
Tamara Frolova, Russian politician
Tamara Georgijev, Serbian handball player
Tamara Gorski, Canadian actor
Tamara Gverdtsiteli, Georgian-Russian singer, actress and composer, People's Artist of Ingushetia, Georgia and Russia.
Kera Tamara, known as Tamara Hejtan, Bulgarian princess, the daughter of the Bulgarian Emperor Ivan Alexander 
Tamara Jaber, Lebanese-Australian singer and songwriter
Tamara Johnson, American indoor volleyball player
Tamara Jones, singer and actress
Tamara Karsavina, Russian ballerina
 Tamara Maria Kler or Tamara Hunkeler, Swiss DJ known by her stage name Dinka
Tamara Larrea, Cuban beach volleyball player
Tamara de Lempicka, Polish art deco painter
Tamara Levitt, Canadian author, mindfulness instructor, and voice-over artist
Tamara Makarova, Russian-Soviet actress
 Tamara Marthe, known as Shy'm, French singer
Tamara McKinney, American skier
Tamara Mello, American actress
Tamara Mellon, president and founder of designer shoes company Jimmy Choo
Tammy Faye Messner, American televangelist and reality TV star
Tamara Metal, Israeli Olympic high jumper and long jumper, and captain of the Israel women's national basketball team
Tamara Mkheidze, Georgian arachnologist
Tamara Moskvina, Russian pairs figure skating coach
Tamara Moss, Indian model
Tamara Gräfin von Nayhauß, German television presenter
Tamara Pamyatnykh, Soviet fighter pilot during the Second World War
Tamara Radočaj (born 1987), Serbian basketball player
Tamara Rojo (born 1974), Spanish ballet dancer, artistic director of English National Ballet
Tamara Salman, Iraqi-born designer
Tamara Samsonova, Russian murderer and suspected serial killer
Tamara Macarena Valcárcel Serrano (born 1984), Spanish singer known as Tamara
Tamara Sher, American psychologist
Tamara Sky, DJ and model
Tamara Sinyavskaya, Russian mezzo-soprano
Tamara Smart (born 2005), English actress
Tamara Sujú, Venezuelan activist
Tamara Taylor, Canadian actress
Tamara Todevska, Macedonian pop singer
Tamara Toumanova, Georgian-Armenian ballerina and actress, active in Paris and Hollywood
Tamara Tunie, American actress
 Tamara Venit-Shelton, American author and professor of American history
 Tamara Diane Wimer, known as Isis Gee, American singer
Tamara Witmer, American actress and model

See also
Tamsin (disambiguation)
Tara (disambiguation)
Palmyra
Tamara (disambiguation)

References

Feminine given names
English feminine given names
Arabic feminine given names
Spanish feminine given names
Slavic feminine given names
German feminine given names
Romanian feminine given names
Russian feminine given names
Circassian feminine given names
Czech feminine given names
Polish feminine given names
Slovak feminine given names
Slovene feminine given names
Macedonian feminine given names
Croatian feminine given names
Serbian feminine given names